Dendrobium discolor, commonly known as antler orchid, is a species of epiphytic or lithophytic orchids in the family Orchidaceae, and are native to northern Australia, New Guinea, and part of Indonesia. It has cylindrical pseudobulbs, each with between ten and thirty five leathery leaves, and flowering stems with up to forty mostly brownish or greenish flowers with wavy and twisted sepals and petals.

Description
The side lobes are large and spread outwards or curve upwards and the middle lobe curves downwards and has at least three ridges and wavy edges. Flowering occurs from April to December.

Taxonomy and naming
Dendrobium discolor was first formally described in 1841 by John Lindley and the description was published in Edwards's Botanical Register. The specific epithet (discolor) is a Latin word meaning "of different colours" or "variegated".

Infraspecifics
 Dendrobium discolor var. broomfieldii (Fitzg.) A.D.Hawkes – the canary orchid has greenish yellow to bright golden yellow flowers from April to December, and occurs on the Whitsunday Islands.
 Dendrobium discolor Lindl. subsp. discolor  – the golden antler orchid has light brown to dark brown, sometimes yellow to yellowish brown flowers with mauve to purple markings on the labellum, between August and November and occurs in Queensland, from the some Torres Strait Islands to Rockhampton.
 Dendrobium discolor var. fimbrilabium (Rchb.f.) Dockrill occurs in parts of Indonesia, New Guinea and Queensland.
 Dendrobium discolor var. fuscum (Fitzg.) Dockrill – the brown antler orchid has relatively small, reddish brown to dark brown flowers with mauve to purple markings on the labellum from April to December and occurs in Queensland, from the some Torres Strait Islands to Mackay.
 Dendrobium discolor subsp. incurvata. Liddle & P.I.Forst. which occurs in Papua New Guinea and Queensland.

Distribution and habitat
Antler orchid grows in coastal scrub and on mangroves, in coastal rainforest, and woodland, sometimes on rocks. It occurs in Queensland, including on the islands of the Great Barrier Reef, New Guinea as well as in the Maluku Islands and Sulawesi in Indonesia.

References

discolor
Orchids of Indonesia
Orchids of New Guinea
Orchids of Queensland
Plants described in 1841